Dinesh Deva is an Indian actor and dancer. He works in Nagpuri albums and Nagpuri films. He is working in the industry since 2001. He is known for the Nagpuri albums and films Nagpur Kar Bhoot, Mahuua, Hum Bhi to Ashique Hain and Gangwa.

Career
He started working in nagpuri albums and films in the year of 2001. He acted in film  Nagpur kar Bhoot, which was a horror comedy movie. In 2013, he acted in movie Bunga re Bunga a Kurukh film. In 2018, he acted in movie Mahuua, which won best Nagpuri film of 2018 in Jharkhand International Film Festival Awards. His upcoming movie is Gangwa, in which actor of Jharkhand Bunty Singh and well known actor of Bollywood Ranjeet, Hemant Birje have acted and Films is directed by Aditya Kumar, the actor of Gangs of Wasseypur – Part 2. In 2022, he acted in Nagpuri film "Karma Dharma", the film about the Karam festival which was released on YouTube.

Filmography

See also
Nagpuri cinema

References

External links

Indian male film actors
Year of birth missing (living people)
Living people
Nagpuria people
People from Ranchi district
People from Jharkhand